Charles Burch may refer to:

 Charles Sumner Burch (1854–1920), Episcopal bishop of New York
 Charles C. Burch (1928–1979), American politician in Tennessee
 Charlie Burch, (1919–2001), English international lawn bowler.